Decision Analyst (founded in 1978) is an American marketing research and consulting firm based in Arlington, Texas. The firm provides global research and analytical consulting services to major corporations, advertising agencies, and marketing consultancies in the Americas, Europe, Asia, the Middle East, and Africa. It is wholly owned by its employees, and is headquartered in the Dallas-Fort Worth area in Texas.

The firm specializes in multinational marketing research studies on marketing strategy, market segmentation, product optimization, advertising testing, package optimization, new product concept testing and forecasting, website optimization, and customer experience optimization.

History 

 1978 – Decision Analyst was founded by Jerry W. Thomas
 1981 – Data Preparation and Data Tabulation Departments were added in April 1981.
 1982 – Software development began in September 1982.
 1982 – The Data Collection Department was added in November 1982.
 1986 – The American Consumer Opinion mail panel was launched in early 1986.
 1996 – Decision Analyst first offered its STATS statistical software free to marketing researchers. 
 1996 – Decision Analyst won the David Ogilvy Award for its marketing research accomplishments on behalf of Tropical Freezes, a new frozen drink introduced nationally in 1995. 
 1996 – The American Consumer Opinion panel was converted to an online survey panel, and started accepting members worldwide.
 1999 – The Technology Advisory Board, Physicians Advisory Council®, and Contractor Advisory Board® online survey panels were added. 
 2000 – The Executive Advisory Board online survey panel was added.
 2002 –The Imaginators consumer ideation panel was launched.
 2003 – The Medical Advisory Board online panel was added.
 2007 – Decision Analyst was part of the team that won the 2007 David Ogilvy Award in the Beverage Category. 
 2008 – For its work with Target, Decision Analyst won Target's Vendor of the Year award for marketing research services.
 2008 – Decision Analyst ranked #1 in Customer Satisfaction according to MarketResearchCareers.com 2008 Annual Survey of Market Research Professionals.
 2009 – Decision Analyst released STATS 2.0 statistical software, its free software for marketing researchers. STATS 2.0 allows users to load, manipulate, and analyze custom data sets through cross-tabulation, correlation, regression, factor analysis, and cluster analysis.
 2011 – Decision Analyst was ranked #1 in customer satisfaction among buyers of full-service marketing research according to MarketResearchCareers.com, Annual Survey of Market Research Professionals released in February 2011.
 2012 - Decision Analyst programmers developed an R Language choice-modeling software package called ChoiceModelR.  The software is free to download.

Software and Resources 

Decision Analyst provides the following software and resources as a public service to the research industry: 
 STATS 2.0 for marketing research, a Windows-based statistical software package for marketing research.
 ChoiceModelR, an open-source software package written in the R language by Decision Analyst statistical programmers. It is designed to analyze data from choice modeling experiments across a wide array of industries, based on surveys of how target market consumers react to many different marketing and product stimuli at different price points (i.e., different scenarios). 
 Marketing Research Glossary
 Marketing Research Articles

See also 

Marketing research
Marketing

References

External links
Company website

Market research companies of the United States
Research and analysis firms of the United States